Janet Edna Merivale Austin  (born ) is a Canadian former nonprofit sector executive and public servant who is the 30th lieutenant governor of British Columbia, having served since 2018. She is the viceregal representative of King Charles III in the province of British Columbia. Prior to her appointment as Lieutenant Governor, she spent 15 years as CEO of YWCA Metro Vancouver.

Austin was appointed by Governor General Julie Payette, on the advice of Prime Minister Justin Trudeau.

Honours
 Order of British Columbia, 2016 (also Chancellor of the Order during her term as Lieutenant Governor, 2018–present)
 Queen Elizabeth II Golden Jubilee Medal, 2002
 Queen Elizabeth II Diamond Jubilee Medal, 2012

References

External links
 Lieutenant Governor & Government House Website

Lieutenant Governors of British Columbia
Living people
Women in British Columbia politics
Canadian women viceroys
21st-century Canadian politicians
21st-century Canadian women politicians
Members of the Order of British Columbia
1950s births